Armando Neyra Chávez (born 18 February 1937) is a Mexican politician affiliated with the PRI. He currently serves as Senator of the LXII Legislature of the Mexican Congress. He also served as Deputy during five Legislatures (1979–82, 1991–94, 1997–2000, 2003–06, 2009–12). Only with verified Elementary School education

References

1937 births
Living people
People from Toluca
Members of the Senate of the Republic (Mexico)
Members of the Chamber of Deputies (Mexico)
Institutional Revolutionary Party politicians
20th-century Mexican politicians
21st-century Mexican politicians
Politicians from the State of Mexico